The following is a list of instruments that are used in modern obstetrics and gynecology.

References

Obstetrics
Gynaecology